CinemaEditor Magazine is a quarterly magazine published by American Cinema Editors (ACE). It began in 1951 as an in-house publication titled The Cinemeditor. It grew to 5,000 subscribers in 1963. In 1971 the title changed to American Cinemeditor. After a two-year suspension, in 1993 it became a monthly newsletter titled Cinemeditor. The publication returned to a magazine format in 1995. In Winter 2001 the title became CinemaEditor. 

Edgar Burcksen presently leads the magazine's team, with Associate Editor Vincent LoBrutto.

References

Film editing
Film magazines published in the United States
Quarterly magazines published in the United States
Magazines established in 1951
Professional and trade magazines
Magazines published in California
Monthly magazines published in the United States